The Aurora Tigers are a Canadian ice hockey team from Aurora, Ontario. They play in the Ontario Junior Hockey League. The team has previously played in the Metro Junior A Hockey League, Ontario Provincial Junior A Hockey League, and the Ontario Junior Hockey League.

History
The Aurora Tigers were first formed in 1967 as a member of the Metro Junior "B" league.  In 1972, the most viable teams were pulled from the Metro and into the OHA Junior "A" league.  The Tigers stayed on board until 1985, and as the financial situation of the league changed and became less viable, the Tigers folded.

In 1987, Aurora's financial interests were intrigued into coming back.  With the OHA Jr. "A" now folded, the Central Junior "B" and Metro Junior "B" were consistently being judged as the heirs to the Junior "A" title.  The Aurora Eagles joined the Central Junior "B" league and stayed there until 1992.

In 1991, tired of the indecisiveness of the Ontario Hockey Association in creating the next Junior "A" league, the now renegade Metro Junior "B" league declared themselves Southern Ontario's only Tier II Junior "A" league.  The league even helped form the Canadian Junior A Hockey League in 1993.  The forwardness of the new Junior "A" league drew the interest of the Aurora franchise.  They joined the league in 1992, reverting to the old "Tigers" nickname.  The Tigers won the Metro league title in 1997 and moved to the OPJHL—a year before the Metro folded.

A new era of the Tigers started in 1997.  The old Central Junior "B" league was promoted to Tier II Junior "A" in 1993 and became the OPJHL.  Since 1997, the Tigers have had winning seasons 8 out of 9 seasons.  In 2002-03, the Tigers had an amazing season (only losing 3 times) but came away with no hardware in the playoffs.  In 2003-04, the Tigers had an unbelievable season.  With a 47-2-0-0 record, the Tigers won the Buckland Cup as OPJHL Playoff Champions, the Dudley Hewitt Cup as Central Canadian Champions, and the Royal Bank Cup as Canadian Junior "A" National Champions.

2003–04 season and playoffs

Dudley Hewitt Cup
The Tigers gained a ticket to the Dudley Hewitt Cup by winning the Buckland Cup as OPJHL champions.  The Tigers started out against the Soo Thunderbirds of the Northern Ontario Junior Hockey League.  Soo failed to win their league but gained a ticket to the DHC as their competitor in the final was the DHC Host.  The game proved to be close, but the Tigers prevailed, 3–1.  In the second game, the Tigers faced the Fort William North Stars, champions of the Superior International Junior Hockey League.  The Tigers shut down their tough opponents with a 4–0 win.  The North Stars, of a relatively new league, are the elite of the Thunder Bay area.  Their third game saw them defeat the NOJHL Champion North Bay Skyhawks, 5–3, which earned them a bye to the DHC final.

The North Bay Skyhawks defeated the Fort William North Stars in the semi-final to meet the Aurora Tigers in the DHC final.  The final, to determine a birth to the Royal Bank Cup 2004, ended up in a decisive 5–1 victory for the Tigers.

Royal Bank Cup 2004
The Aurora Tigers started off their Royal Bank Cup 2004 tournament against a well-rested host team, the Grande Prairie Storm of the Alberta Junior Hockey League.  The Storm defeated the Tigers by a score of 4-2, their last loss of the season.  Game two was against the Nanaimo Clippers of the British Columbia Hockey League, the Doyle Cup Champions, defeating them 4-2.  The next game pitted the Tigers against the Anavet Cup Champions Kindersley Klippers from the Saskatchewan Junior Hockey League.  The Tigers won by a score of 5-0.  The fourth round robin game saw the Tigers defeat the Fred Page Cup Champion Nepean Raiders of the Central Junior A Hockey League by a score of 3-1.

The Tigers finished tied for first in the round robin, but second by tie breaker.  In the Semi-final, they drew the Nepean Raiders again but this time beat them in convincing fashion 7-2.  Kindersley upset the hosts 4-3 in the other Semi-final, drawing a lopsided 7-1 victory for the Tigers against the Klippers in the Final, earning them their first Royal Bank Cup.

2006–07 season and playoffs

The Tigers finished the 2006-07 season with the top record in the OPJHL and as the top ranked team in all of the CJAHL—44 wins, 4 losses, and 1 tie.

In the playoffs, they first swept the Buffalo Jr. Sabres 4-games-to-none.  They then beat the Newmarket Hurricanes 4-games-to-2.  In the Division final, they defeated the Stouffville Spirit 4-games-to-1.  In the Conference final, they defeated the Hamilton Red Wings 4-games-to-1 and then defeated the Wellington Dukes 4-games-to-1 to clinch the Buckland Cup as OPJHL Champions.

Dudley Hewitt Cup
In late April, the Tigers drove North to Iroquois Falls, Ontario to compete for their second Dudley Hewitt Cup.  In the tourney opener, the Tigers defeated the NOJHL Champion Soo Indians 4-1.  They then went the next night and beat the SIJHL Champion Schreiber Diesels 6-3.  In the final game of the round robin, the Tiger beat up the host Abitibi Eskimos 7-0 to clinch first place and a bye to the tournament final.  In the final game, the Tigers defeated Schreiber Diesels 10-0, having outshot them 67-23 and earning a birth to the Royal Bank Cup 2007.

Royal Bank Cup 2007
The Tigers started off with a 4-2 win over the Selkirk Steelers (MJHL).  Aurora then suffered a disappointing loss to the Pembroke Lumber Kings (CJHL), 5-3.  They then took out their frustration on the host Prince George Spruce Kings (BCHL) with a 6-3 victory and then flexed some muscle with a 7-4 dismantling of their most anticipated opponent, the Camrose Kodiaks (AJHL).  With a 3-1 record in the round robin, the Tiger clinched first place and the early semi-final against the 4th seed Pembroke Lumber Kings.  The rematch was ugly, with the Lumber Kings leading 2-1 at one point.  The Tigers tied up the game to force overtime and then tournament MVP, Top Forward, and Scoring Champion Daniel Michalsky scored the winner early in the extra frame.  The Tigers went on to face Prince George in the final as they had disposed of Camrose 3-2 in fifth overtime the night before.  By early in the third, the Tigers had built up a 3-0 lead and held on to win 3-1 to win their second Royal Bank Cup in four years.

Accolades
The Tigers finished the season with a combined 73 wins, 10 losses, and 1 tie.  Their 2006-07 accolades include the Regular Season Crown, the #1 CJAHL National Ranking, the North Division Championship, the North/West Conference Championship, the OPJHL Buckland Cup, the Ontario Hockey Association Championship, the Ontario Hockey Federation Championship, the Dudley Hewitt Cup, and the Royal Bank Cup as the Best Junior "A" Team in Canada.

Season-by-season results

Playoffs
Original OPJHL Years
1973 Lost Quarter-final
Toronto Nationals defeated Aurora Tigers 4-games-to-none
1974 Lost Final
Aurora Tigers defeated Seneca Flyers 4-games-to-2
Aurora Tigers defeated North York Rangers 4-games-to-none
Wexford Raiders defeated Aurora Tigers 4-games-to-1
1975 Lost Quarter-final
Wexford Raiders defeated Aurora Tigers 4-games-to-none
1976 DNQ
1977 Lost Quarter-final
North Bay Trappers defeated Aurora Tigers 4-games-to-3
1978 Lost Quarter-final
Dixie Beehives defeated Aurora Tigers 4-games-to-1
1979 Lost Quarter-final
Dixie Beehives defeated Aurora Tigers 4-games-to-none
1980 Lost Semi-final
Aurora Tigers defeated Belleville Bulls 4-games-to-3
Royal York Royals defeated Aurora Tigers 4-games-to-2
1981 DNQ
1982 Lost Quarter-final
Markham Waxers defeated Aurora Tigers 4-games-to-1
1983 DNQ
1984 Lost Quarter-final
Dixie Beehives defeated Aurora Tigers 4-games-to-none
1985 Lost Final, Lost Dudley Hewitt Cup final, Lost 1985 Centennial Cup semi-final
Aurora Tigers defeated North York Red Wings 4-games-to-none
Aurora Tigers defeated Newmarket Flyers 4-games-to-3
Orillia Travelways defeated Aurora Tigers 4-games-to-none
Aurora Tigers defeated Sudbury Cubs (NOJHL) 4-games-to-none
Third in 1985 Centennial Cup round robin (1-2)
Penticton Knights (BCJHL) defeated Aurora Tigers 8-5 in semi-final
1986 Did Not Participate
1987 Lost Final
Aurora Eagles defeated Richmond Hill Dynes 4-games-to-2
Owen Sound Greys defeated Aurora Eagles 4-games-to-none
MetJHL Years
1993 Lost Quarter-final
Aurora Eagles defeated Bramalea Blues 3-games-to-1
Muskoka Bears defeated Aurora Eagles 4-games-to-2
1994 DNQ
1995 Lost Quarter-final
St. Michael's Buzzers defeated Aurora Eagles 4-games-to-2
1996 Lost Quarter-final
Niagara Scenic defeated Aurora Tigers 4-games-to-3
1997 Won League
Aurora Tigers defeated Durham Huskies 4-games-to-none
Second in round robin quarter-final (4-2)
Aurora Tigers defeated Quinte Hawks 4-games-to-2
Aurora Tigers defeated Caledon Canadians 4-games-to-none METJHL CHAMPIONS
OJHL Years
1998 Lost Division Semi-final
Newmarket Hurricanes defeated Aurora Tigers 4-games-to-1
1999 Lost Division Semi-final
Aurora Tigers defeated Markham Waxers 3-games-to-1
Collingwood Blues defeated Aurora Tigers 4-games-to-1
2000 Lost Division Quarter-final
Stouffville Spirit defeated Aurora Tigers 4-games-to-none
2001 Lost Division Quarter-final
Collingwood Blues defeated Aurora Tigers 4-games-to-1
2002 Lost Conference Final
Aurora Tigers defeated Parry Sound Shamrocks 4-games-to-1
Aurora Tigers defeated Couchiching Terriers 4-games-to-1
Aurora Tigers defeated Newmarket Hurricanes 4-games-to-none
Brampton Capitals defeated Aurora Tigers 4-games-to-none
2003 Lost Final
Aurora Tigers defeated Bramalea Blues 4-games-to-none
Aurora Tigers defeated Collingwood Blues 4-games-to-1
Aurora Tigers defeated Stouffville Spirit 4-games-to-2
Aurora Tigers defeated Georgetown Raiders 4-games-to-1
Wellington Dukes defeated Aurora Tigers 4-games-to-2
2004 Won League, Won OHF Ruddock Trophy, Won Dudley Hewitt Cup, Won 2004 Royal Bank Cup
Aurora Tigers defeated Lindsay Muskies 4-games-to-none
Aurora Tigers defeated Collingwood Blues 4-games-to-none
Aurora Tigers defeated Newmarket Hurricanes 4-games-to-none
Aurora Tigers defeated Oakville Blades 4-games-to-2
Aurora Tigers defeated St. Michael's Buzzers 4-games-to-2 OPJHL CHAMPIONS
First in Dudley Hewitt Cup round robin (3-0) RUDDOCK TROPHY CHAMPIONS
Aurora Tigers defeated North Bay Skyhawks (NOJHL) 5-1 in final DUDLEY HEWITT CUP CHAMPIONS
Second in 2004 Royal Bank Cup round robin (3-1)
Aurora Tigers defeated Nepean Raiders (CJHL) 7-2 in semi-final
Aurora Tigers defeated Kindersley Klippers (SJHL) 7-1 in final ROYAL BANK CUP CHAMPIONS
2005 Lost Conference Final
Aurora Tigers defeated Syracuse Jr. Crunch 4-games-to-1
Aurora Tigers defeated Huntsville-Muskoka Otters 4-games-to-2
Aurora Tigers defeated Newmarket Hurricanes 4-games-to-2
Georgetown Raiders defeated Aurora Tigers 4-games-to-3
2006 Lost Division Final
Aurora Tigers defeated Bancroft Hawks 4-games-to-none
Aurora Tigers defeated Collingwood Blues 4-games-to-1
Stouffville Spirit defeated Aurora Tigers 4-games-to-2
2007 Won League, Won OHF Ruddock Trophy, Won Dudley Hewitt Cup, Won 2007 Royal Bank Cup
Aurora Tigers defeated Buffalo Jr. Sabres 4-games-to-none
Aurora Tigers defeated Newmarket Hurricanes 4-games-to-2
Aurora Tigers defeated Stouffville Spirit 4-games-to-1
Aurora Tigers defeated Hamilton Red Wings 4-games-to-1
Aurora Tigers defeated Wellington Dukes 4-games-to-1 OPJHL CHAMPIONS
First in Dudley Hewitt Cup round robin (3-0) RUDDOCK TROPHY CHAMPIONS
Aurora Tigers defeated Schreiber Diesels (SIJHL) 10-0 in final DUDLEY HEWITT CUP CHAMPIONS
First in 2007 Royal Bank Cup round robin (3-1)
Aurora Tigers defeated Pembroke Lumber Kings (CJHL) 3-2 OT in semi-final
Aurora Tigers defeated Prince George Spruce Kings (BCHL) 3-1 in final ROYAL BANK CUP CHAMPIONS
2008 Lost Conference Final
Aurora Tigers defeated Orangeville Crushers 3-games-to-none
Aurora Tigers defeated Newmarket Hurricanes 4-games-to-1
Aurora Tigers defeated Stouffville Spirit 4-games-to-1
Oakville Blades defeated Aurora Tigers 4-games-to-2
2009 Lost Division Semi-final
Aurora Tigers defeated Collingwood Blues 3-games-to-1
Huntsville Otters defeated Aurora Tigers 4-games-to-2
2010 Lost OJAHL Quarter-final
Oakville Blades defeated Aurora Tigers 4-games-to-1
2011 DNQ
2012 Lost Division Semi-final
Aurora Tigers defeated Orangeville Flyers 3-games-to-1
Stouffville Spirit defeated Aurora Tigers 4-games-to-1

Sutherland Cup appearances
1959: Sarnia Legionnaires defeated Aurora Bruins 4-games-to-2 with 1 tie

Notable alumni

David Clarkson
Steve Downie
Bryan Fogarty
Evan Fong
Anwar Hared
Greg Hotham
Mike Johnson
Derek Joslin
Chris Kelly
Mike Kitchen
Mike Kostka
Jamie Macoun
Dominic Moore
Rick Morocco
Jim Rutherford

References

External links
Tigers Website

Ontario Provincial Junior A Hockey League teams
Aurora, Ontario